Geoffrey Lewis may refer to:

 Geoffrey Lewis (actor) (1935–2015), American character actor
 Geoffrey Lewis (scholar) (1920–2008), British professor of Turkish
 Geoffrey Lewis (philatelist), Australian philatelist
 Geoffrey W. Lewis (died 1992), American diplomat

See also
Jeffrey Lewis (disambiguation)